Roger Joseph, Baron Van Overstraeten (7 December 1937, Vlezenbeek – 29 April 1999, Leuven) was a professor at the Catholic University of Leuven and later the Katholieke Universiteit te Leuven, an IEEE Fellow and the founder of the micro- and nanoelectronics research center IMEC.

Van Overstraeten earned a PhD from Stanford University in 1963.

Honors and awards
In 1989 he was awarded the first Becquerel Prize by the European Commission.

In 1990 Van Overstraeten was elevated to Baron and he received the IEEE Frederik Philips Award (1999).

References

1937 births
1999 deaths
Fellow Members of the IEEE
Stanford University alumni
Academic staff of KU Leuven
People from Sint-Pieters-Leeuw